Speed skating at the 2011 Canada Winter Games was held at the permanent Canada Games Oval in Halifax, Nova Scotia.

The events were held during the first week between February 12 and 16, 2011.

Men

Women

References

2011 in speed skating
2011 Canada Winter Games
Canada 2011